Air is a 2023 American biographical sports drama film directed by Ben Affleck and written by Alex Convery. The film stars Matt Damon, Affleck, Jason Bateman, Marlon Wayans, Chris Messina, Chris Tucker, and Viola Davis. Its plot chronicles the origin of the Air Jordan shoeline; a Nike, Inc. employee seeks to strike a business deal with rookie basketball player Michael Jordan.
 
Air premiered at South by Southwest on March 18, 2023. It is scheduled to be theatrically released in the United States on April 5, 2023, by Amazon Studios, making it the first film Amazon has released in theaters without simultaneously premiering on Prime Video since 2019's Late Night.

Premise
Sonny Vaccaro, a shoe salesman at Nike, works to sign rookie Michael Jordan to a deal to wear their shoes.

Cast

Production
The script was written by Alex Convery in 2021, appearing on that year's Black List under the title Air Jordan. It was reported in April 2022 that the script was picked up at Amazon Studios, with Ben Affleck and Matt Damon teaming to star in the film, while Affleck would direct.

Filming began in Los Angeles on June 6, 2022, with Jason Bateman, Viola Davis, Chris Tucker, Marlon Wayans and Chris Messina amongst several additions to the cast. Robert Richardson served as cinematographer, using the Arri Alexa 35 camera to film with. It wrapped up in July 2022. The same month, Joel Gretsch, Gustaf Skarsgård and Jessica Green were announced to be among the cast. The character of Michael Jordan, however, is not portrayed in the film.

Release
Air is scheduled for a wide theatrical release in the United States on April 5, 2023, the first Amazon has given since 2019's Late Night. Warner Bros. Pictures will handle the film's international theatrical release, through its distribution deal with the Amazon-owned Metro-Goldwyn-Mayer. Amazon will also give the film a longer theatrical window before hitting Prime Video globally than their previous limited theatrical releases. This decision would also result in Amazon shutting down United Artists Releasing and folding its operations into MGM. It closed out the South by Southwest festival on March 18, 2023.

Amazon spent $7 million on an ad which aired during Super Bowl LVII.

Reception

Critical reception
On review aggregator website Rotten Tomatoes, 100% of 8 reviews are positive, with an average rating of 8.5/10. Metacritic, another review aggregator, assigned the film a weighted average score of 80 out of 100, based on 6 critics, indicating "generally favorable reviews".

References

External links
 

2023 drama films
2020s American films
2020s biographical drama films
2020s sports drama films
2020s English-language films
American biographical drama films
American sports drama films
Amazon Studios films
Films directed by Ben Affleck
Films produced by Ben Affleck
Films produced by Matt Damon
Films produced by Peter Guber
Films shot in Los Angeles
Mandalay Pictures films
Michael Jordan
Skydance Media films
Warner Bros. films